The Bodil Award for Best Documentary is one of the categories for the Bodil Awards presented annually by the Danish Film Critics Association. It was created in 1948 but has only been presented annually since 2007.

Honorees

1940s and 1950s 
 1948:  directed by 
 1956: Hvor bjergene sejler directed by Bjarne Henning-Jensen
 1957:  directed by

1960s 
 1961:  directed by 
 1964:  directed by Børge Høst
 1965:  and  directed by 
 1966:  directed by 
 1968:  directed by Claus Ørsted
 1969:  directed by Peter Refn

1970s 
 1970:  directed by Per Holst
 1972:  directed by Jørgen Leth
 1976:  directed by Solvognen
 1978:  directed by

1980s 
 1981:  directed by Lone Hertz
 1982:  directed by Hans-Henrik Jørgensen
 1984:  directed by 
 1986:  directed by Jytte Rex

1990s 
 1996: Carl Th. Dreyer: My Metier directed by

2000s 
 2005: Tintin and I directed by 
 2007: Gasolin' directed by Anders Østergaard
 2008: The Monastery: Mr. Vig and the Nun directed by Pernille Rose Grønkjær
 2009: Burma VJ directed by Anders Østergaard

2010s 
 2010:  directed by Anders Riis-Hansen
 2011: Armadillo directed by Janus Metz
 2012:  directed by 
 2013: Putin's Kiss directed by 
 2014: Ai Weiwei: The Fake Case directed by Andreas Johnsen
 2015: The Look of Silence directed by Joshua Oppenheimer
 2016: The Man Who Saved the World directed by Peter Anthony
 2017: The War Show directed by Obaidah Zytoon and 
 2018: Last Men in Aleppo directed by Feras Fayyad
 :  directed by 
  directed by Elvira Lind
 Fanget i de fries land directed by Camilla Magid
  directed by Janus Metz & 
  directed by Emil Næsby Hansen

2020s 
 :  directed by Emil Langballe
 Et ægte par directed by Emil Langballe
 Forglem mig ej directed by Sun Hee Engelstoft
  directed by Sidse Torstholm Larsen and Sturla Pilskog
 Western Arabs directed by 
 2021: En splittet familie directed by Mira Jargil
 The Cave directed by Feras Fayyad
  directed by 
  directed by Erlend E. Mo
 Undertrykkelsens sang directed by Estephan Wagner and Marianne Hougen-Moraga

See also 

 Robert Award for Best Documentary Feature
 Robert Award for Best Documentary Short

References

Sources

Further reading

External links 
  

1948 establishments in Denmark
Awards established in 1948
Documentary
 
Documentary film awards